Bobo is a census-designated place and unincorporated community in Coahoma County, Mississippi, United States. Bobo is located on U.S. routes 61 and 278, southwest of Clarksdale.

It was first named as a CDP in the 2020 Census which listed a population of 118.

History
Bobo was named for world-champion bear hunter Robert E. Bobo. Bobo is located on the former Yazoo and Mississippi Valley Railroad and was once home to six general stores, a grocery store, and two sawmills. A post office operated under the name Bobo from 1886 to 1973.

Demographics

2020 census

Note: the US Census treats Hispanic/Latino as an ethnic category. This table excludes Latinos from the racial categories and assigns them to a separate category. Hispanics/Latinos can be of any race.

Notable people
 Junior Parker, Memphis blues singer
 Joe Willie Wilkins, blues musician, grew up on a plantation near Bobo.

References

Unincorporated communities in Coahoma County, Mississippi
Unincorporated communities in Mississippi
Census-designated places in Coahoma County, Mississippi